These are the Australian number-one albums of 2005, per the ARIA Charts.

See also
2005 in music
List of number-one singles in Australia in 2005

Notes
Number of number one albums: 24
Longest run at number one (during 2005): The Sound of White by Missy Higgins and In Your Honor by Foo Fighters (5 weeks)

References

2005
Australia Albums
2005 in Australian music